These are the results of the November 6, 2005, municipal elections in Quebec for the region of Estrie. Some mayors and councillors were elected without opposition from October 14, 2005.

Asbestos
Electors: 5 566
Voters: 3 318 (60%)
Councillor 5 was elected without opposition.
 Mayor: Jean-Philippe Bachand
 Councillor 1: Nathalie Durocher
 Councillor 2: Alain Roy
 Councillor 3: Serge Boislard
 Councillor 4: Nicole Forgues
 Councillor 5: Jean Roy
 Councillor 6: Pierre Benoit

Ascot Corner
Electors: 1 931
Voters: 663 (34%)
Councillor 1 and 4 were elected without opposition.
 Mayor: Fabien Morin
 Councillor 1: Nathalie Bresse
 Councillor 2: Sylvie Boucher
 Councillor 3: Patrick Langlois
 Councillor 4: D. Michel Carbonneau
 Councillor 5: Donald Lachance
 Councillor 6: Valérie Roy

Audet
All elected without opposition.
 Mayor: André Grenier
 Councillor 1: Karine Paquet
 Councillor 2: André Béliveau
 Councillor 3: Jean-Marc Grondin
 Councillor 4: Claudette Bruneau
 Councillor 5: Marthe Bélanger
 Councillor 6: Éric Langlois

Austin
Mayor and councillors 1, 2, 3, 4 and 6 were elected without opposition.
 Mayor: Roger Nicolet
 Councillor 1: Arthur Bryant
 Councillor 2: Lisette Maillé
 Councillor 3: Jean-Claude Duff
 Councillor 4: Marco Scholer
 Councillor 5: Jean-Marc Couture
 Councillor 6: Denis Lachance

Ayer's Cliff
All elected without opposition.
 Mayor: Vincent Gérin
 Councillor 1: Perle Bouchard
 Councillor 2: Roger Dumouchel
 Councillor 4: Nathalie Grenier
 Councillor 5: Isabel Marcotte
 Councillor 6: Carolina Bastida

Barnston-Ouest
Electors: 480
Voters: 331 (69%)
Councillors 1 and 4 were elected without opposition.
 Mayor: Ghislaine Leblond
 Councillor 1: Marianne Santschi
 Councillor 2: Richard D'amour
 Councillor 3: Charles Brus
 Councillor 4: Serge Tremblay
 Councillor 5: Carole Blais
 Councillor 6: Raymond Roy

Bolton-Est
Electors: 668
Voters: 307 (46%)
Councillors 1, 2 and 3 were elected without opposition.
 Mayor: Joan Westland Eby
 Councillor 1: Roger Gagné
 Councillor 2: Bruno Beauregard
 Councillor 3: Pamela Galvin
 Councillor 4: Charles Laurin
 Councillor 5: Billy Woodard
 Councillor 6: Ginette Breton

Bonsecours
All elected without opposition.
 Mayor: Cécile Laliberté
 Councillor 1: Vacancy
 Councillor 2: Richard Plante
 Councillor 3: Serge Emond
 Councillor 4: Cécile Lapalme
 Councillor 5: Alain Forget
 Councillor 6: Jean Tétreault

Bury
Electors: 957
Voters: 656 (69%)
Councillors 2, 3, 4, 5 and 6 were elected without opposition.
 Mayor: Marc Jacques Gosselin
 Councillor 1: Walter Dougherty
 Councillor 2: James Cork
 Councillor 3: Lynne Martel Bégin
 Councillor 4: Stéphane Sévigny
 Councillor 5: Daniel Breton
 Councillor 6: Nicole Fortier

Chartierville
All elected without opposition.
 Mayor: Jean-René Ré
 Councillor 1: Ronald Fortier
 Councillor 2: Yvon Côté
 Councillor 3: Lise Bellehumeur
 Councillor 4: Claude Pratte
 Councillor 5: Johnny Guertin
 Councillor 6: Micheline P. Fortier

Cleveland
Electors: 1 325
Voters: 776 (59%)
Councillors 1, 3, 4, 5 and 6 were elected without opposition.
 Mayor: Gerald Badger
 Councillor 1: David G. Crack
 Councillor 2: Bertrand Ménard
 Councillor 3: Herman Herbers
 Councillor 4: Johnny Vander Wal
 Councillor 5: Henry Schroeders
 Councillor 6: Pierre Grandmont

Coaticook
Mayor and councillors 2, 5 and 6 were elected without opposition.
 Mayor: Bertrand Lamoureux
 Councillor 1: Charles Poulin
 Councillor 2: Madeleine Drolet
 Councillor 3: Sylvain Véronneau
 Councillor 4: Raynald Drolet
 Councillor 5: Lionel Giroux
 Councillor 6: Gaétan Labelle

Compton
All elected without opposition.
 Mayor: Fernand Veilleux
 Councillor 1: Miguel Gilbert
 Councillor 2: Monique Clément
 Councillor 3: Jean-Noël Groleau
 Councillor 4: Jacques Blain
 Councillor 5: Robert Paré
 Councillor 6: Denis Beaudoin

Cookshire-Eaton
Electors: 3 901
Voters: 2 016 (52%)
 Mayor: Normand Potvin
 Councillor 1: Simon Simard
 Councillor 2: Bruno Breton
 Councillor 3: Denise Grenier
 Councillor 4: Patrice Dodier
 Councillor 5: Jack Garneau
 Councillor 6: Chantal Rouleau

Courcelles
All elected without opposition.
 Mayor: Mario Quirion
 Councillor 1: André Labonté
 Councillor 2: Claude Goulet
 Councillor 3: Diane Rancourt
 Councillor 4: Hugues Arguin
 Councillor 5: Léon Longchamps
 Councillor 6: Simon Bélanger

Danville
Mayor and councillors 1, 2, 3, 5 and 6 were elected without opposition.
 Mayor: Jacques Hémond
 Councillor 1: Francine Labelle Girard
 Councillor 2: Jean-Guy Dionne
 Councillor 3: Germain Ducharme
 Councillor 4: Michel Plourde
 Councillor 5: Bernard Laroche
 Councillor 6: Yvon Therriault

Dixville
All elected without opposition.
 Mayor: Réal Ouimette
 Councillor 1: Julie Jones
 Councillor 2: Richard Couture
 Councillor 3: Pierre Paquette
 Councillor 4: Alain Quirion
 Councillor 5: Mario Tremblay
 Councillor 6: Daniel Lessard

Dudswell
Mayor and councillors 1, 2, 3, 5 and 6 were elected without opposition.
 Mayor: Nicole Robert
 Councillor 1: Maurice Dodier
 Councillor 2: Jean-Pierre Breton
 Councillor 3: Micheline Breton
 Councillor 4: Réjean Cloutier
 Councillor 5: Claude Corriveau
 Councillor 6: Denis Ouellette

East Angus
Electors: 2 671
Voters: 1 582 (59%)
Councillors 1 and 3 were elected without opposition.
 Mayor: Martin Mailhot
 Councillor 1: Lyne Boulanger
 Councillor 2: Véronique Bruneau
 Councillor 3: Robert G. Roy
 Councillor 4: Yvon Ménard
 Councillor 5: Nicolas Lagueux
 Councillor 6: Jacquelin Campagna

East Hereford
All elected without opposition.
 Mayor: Richard Belleville
 Councillor 1: Steve Isabelle
 Councillor 2: Patrick McDuff
 Councillor 3: Guy Beloin
 Councillor 4: Édith Comeau
 Councillor 5: Ronald Owen
 Councillor 6: Brigitte Inkel

Eastman
Mayor and councillors 1, 2, 3 and 6 were elected without opposition.
 Mayor: Gérard Marinovich
 Councillor 1: Danielle Simard
 Councillor 2: Jean-Guy Nadeau
 Councillor 3: Richard Normand
 Councillor 4: André A. Pilon
 Councillor 5: Jacques Favreau
 Councillor 6: Yvon Laramée

Frontenac
Electors: 1 318
Voters: 964 (73%)
Councillors 1, 2, 3 and 6 were elected without opposition.
 Mayor: Jean-Denis Cloutier
 Councillor 1: Clermont Lapointe
 Councillor 2: Denis Vachon
 Councillor 3: Rénald Blais
 Councillor 4: Pierre Philippon
 Councillor 5: Guy Grenier
 Councillor 6: Carole Bourgault

Hampden
All elected without opposition.
 Mayor: Normand Côté
 Councillor 1: Monique Christine Scholz
 Councillor 2: Lisa Irving
 Councillor 3: Alain Thibault
 Councillor 4: Guy Poirier
 Councillor 5: Sylvain Delage
 Councillor 6: Bertrand Prévost

Hatley

Municipality of Hatley 
All elected without opposition.
 Mayor: Jacques de Léséleuc
 Councillor 1: Chantal Montminy
 Councillor 2: Bruno Côté
 Councillor 3: Éric Hammal
 Councillor 4: Pierre Robert
 Councillor 5: Bernard Paré
 Councillor 6: Gilles Viens

Township of Hatley
Mayor and councillors 1, 3, 4 and 5 were elected without opposition.
 Mayor: Pierre-A. Levac
 Councillor 1: D'Arcy Ryan
 Councillor 2: Gina Fattore
 Councillor 3: Martin Primeau
 Councillor 4: Claude B. Meilleur
 Councillor 5: Guy Larkin
 Councillor 6: Jacques Bogenez

Kingsbury
Electors: 131
Voters: 109 (83%)
Councillors 1, 2, 3 and 4 were elected without opposition.
 Mayor: Jean Dandurand
 Councillor 1: Yves Doiron
 Councillor 2: Mary Hogan
 Councillor 3: Mario Poitras
 Councillor 4: Michel Thibeault
 Councillor 5: Pierre Pivin
 Councillor 6: Claude Mailhot

La Patrie
All elected without opposition.
 Mayor: Jacques Blais
 Councillor 1: Guy Maheu
 Councillor 2: Robert Delage
 Councillor 3: Alain Dubreuil
 Councillor 4: Marie-Anne Spooner
 Councillor 5: Robert Décary
 Councillor 6: Michel Morin

Lac-Drolet
Electors: 886
Voters: 606 (68%)
Councillors 1, 2, 3, 4 and 6 were elected without opposition.
 Mayor: Jean-Guy Gagnon
 Councillor 1: Martin Therrien
 Councillor 2: Marc Théberge
 Councillor 3: Marc Dubé
 Councillor 4: Carole Laplante
 Councillor 5: Daniel Faucher
 Councillor 6: Carole Gagnon

Lac-Mégantic
Mayor and councillors 2, 3, 4 and 5 were elected without opposition.
 Mayor: Colette Roy-Laroche
 Councillor 1: Berthier Arguin
 Councillor 2: Yvette Desjardins
 Councillor 3: Jean-Guy Bouffard
 Councillor 4: Daniel Gendron
 Councillor 5: Viola Lefebvre
 Councillor 6: Roger Garant

Lambton
Electors: 1 431
Voters: 1 032 (72%)
 Mayor: Raymonde Lapointe
 Councillor 1: Roch Lachance
 Councillor 2: Ghislain Bolduc
 Councillor 3: Jacinthe Martel
 Councillor 4: André Bisson
 Councillor 5: Cécile Richard
 Councillor 6: Gaston Veilleux

Lawrenceville
Electors: 477
Voters: 300 (63%)
Councillor 1 was elected without opposition.
 Mayor: Daniel Héroux
 Councillor 1: Derek Grilli
 Councillor 2: Pascal Deschamps
 Councillor 3: Yves Arès
 Councillor 4: Jocelyn Cleary
 Councillor 5: Dany Chapdelaine
 Councillor 6: Mario Casavant

Lingwick
Mayor and councillors 1, 2, 3, 4 and 5 were elected without opposition.
 Mayor: Céline Gagné
 Councillor 1: Marcel Guillemette
 Councillor 2: Claude Després
 Councillor 3: Marc Poulin
 Councillor 4: Gaston Cloutier
 Councillor 5: Serge Gilbert
 Councillor 6: Jean-Guy Marois

Magog
Mayor and councillors 3, 6, 7 and 10 were elected without opposition.
 Mayor:  Poulin
 Councillor 1: Michel Bombardier
 Councillor 2: Stéphane Simard
 Councillor 3: Denise Poulin-Marcotte
 Councillor 4: Alain Vanden Eynden
 Councillor 5: Vicki May Hamm
 Councillor 6: Jacques Laurendeau
 Councillor 7: Gilbert Kurt Boucher
 Councillor 8: Gilles Robinson
 Councillor 9: Serge Gosselin
 Councillor 10: Jocelyne Mongrain

Maricourt
Electors: 383
Voters: 217 (57%)
Councillors 1, 2, 3, 4 and 6 were elected without opposition.
 Mayor: Réjean Paquette
 Councillor 1: Guylaine Gaudreau
 Councillor 2: Valérie Bombardier
 Councillor 3: Robert Ledoux
 Councillor 4: Paul Purcel
 Councillor 5: Gilles Desmarais
 Councillor 6: Isabelle Plante

Marston
Electors: 576
Voters: 329 (57%)
All councillors were elected without opposition.
 Mayor: Jacques Lalonde
 Councillor 1: Paul Morin
 Councillor 2: Yves Chouinard
 Councillor 3: Esther Arguin
 Councillor 4: Jacques Cameron
 Councillor 5: Gaston Audet Lapointe
 Councillor 6: Gérald Roy

Martinville
All elected without opposition.
 Mayor: Réjean Masson
 Councillor 1: Catherine Viens
 Councillor 2: Francis Côté
 Councillor 3: Réal Côté
 Councillor 4: Michel-Henri Goyette
 Councillor 5: Gaby Côté
 Councillor 6: France D.-Scalabrini

Melbourne
Electors: 788
Voters: 470 (60%)
Councillors 1, 2, 3, 5 and 6 were elected without opposition.
 Mayor: Daryl Grainger
 Councillor 1: Hilda Markis
 Councillor 2: André Poirier
 Councillor 3: Jeffery Garrett
 Councillor 4: James Johnston
 Councillor 5: Raymond Fortier
 Councillor 6: Valérie Guénette

Milan
All elected without opposition.
 Mayor: Claude Turcotte
 Councillor 1: Stéphane Patry
 Councillor 2: Linda Breton
 Councillor 3: Jacques Proteau
 Councillor 4: Gaston Denis
 Councillor 5: Maurice Proteau
 Councillor 6: Louiselle Gazaille

Nantes
Mayor and councillors 1, 2, 4 and 5 were elected without opposition.
 Mayor: Ginette Dupuis
 Councillor 1: Bernard Isabel
 Councillor 2: Bruno Couture
 Councillor 3: Claude Poulin
 Councillor 4: Yvan Arsenault
 Councillor 5: André Dallaire
 Councillor 6: Jacques Breton

Newport
Electors: 647
Voters: 350 (54%)
Councillors 4 and 6 were elected without opposition.
 Mayor: Malcolm Burns
 Councillor 1: Anne-Marie Yeates-Dubeau
 Councillor 2: Diane Fiset
 Councillor 3: Yvonne Mayne-Wilkin
 Councillor 4: Jacques Boutin
 Councillor 5: Isabelle Massé
 Councillor 6: Leslie MacLeod

North Hatley
Mayor and councillors 1, 2, 4, 5 and 6 were elected without opposition.
 Mayor: Stephan Doré
 Councillor 1: John Rasmussen
 Councillor 2: Paul Caron
 Councillor 3: Line Fortin
 Councillor 4: Carrol Haller
 Councillor 5: Michael Page
 Councillor 6: Peter Provencher

Notre-Dame-des-Bois
Electors: 718
Voters: 513 (71%)
Councillors 1, 3, 4 and 6 were elected without opposition.
 Mayor: Jean-Louis Gobeil
 Councillor 1: Hélène Prévost
 Councillor 2: Dominique Descoteaux
 Councillor 3: Claude Granger
 Councillor 4: Sylvie Charbonneau
 Councillor 5: Gilles Goyette
 Councillor 6: Richard Langelier

Ogden
 Mayor: Michael Sudlow
 Councillor 1: Normand Gélinas
 Councillor 2: Pierre Larocque
 Councillor 3: Gordon A. Rowe
 Councillor 4: Joe Stairs
 Councillor 5: Norma-Gene Cauchon
 Councillor 6: Rod Cooper

Orford
Electors: 2 709
Voters: 1 565 (58%)
 Mayor: Pierre Rodier
 Councillor 1: Jacqueline Ascah
 Councillor 2: Jean-Guy Beaulieu
 Councillor 3: Réjean Beaudette
 Councillor 4: Michel Cousineau
 Councillor 5: Pierre Bastien
 Councillor 6: Robert Dezainde

Piopolis
All elected without opposition.
 Mayor: Marc Beaulé
 Councillor 1: Martine Bastien
 Councillor 2: Germain Grenier
 Councillor 3: Marie-Claire Deforge-Thivierge
 Councillor 4: Claudette Grenier
 Councillor 5: Serge Gosselin
 Councillor 6: Danielle Dodier

Potton
Mayor and councillors 1, 2, 3, 5 and 6 were elected without opposition.
 Mayor: Claude Laplume
 Councillor 1: Lorna Aiken-Lamothe
 Councillor 2: Barbara Koch
 Councillor 3: Louis Veillon
 Councillor 4: J. Michael Head
 Councillor 5: Jean Filion
 Councillor 6: Christian Rodrigue

Racine
Electors: 1 007
Voters: 654 (65%)
Councillor 6 was elected without opposition.
 Mayor: René Pelletier
 Councillor 1: Louise Demers
 Councillor 2: Francine Desaulniers
 Councillor 3: Raymond Dussault
 Councillor 4: Annie Vincent
 Councillor 5: Michel Brien
 Councillor 6: Éric Courtemanche

Richmond
Mayor and councillors 1, 2 and 5 were elected without opposition.
 Mayor: Marc-André Martel
 Councillor 1: Charles Mallette
 Councillor 2: Paul Gifford
 Councillor 3: Réal Veilleux
 Councillor 4: Daniel Blanchette
 Councillor 5: Daniel Ménard
 Councillor 6: Clifford Lancaster

Saint-Adrien
Mayor and councillors 3, 4, 5 and 6 were elected without opposition.
 Mayor: Pierre Therrien
 Councillor 1: Mélanie Poulin
 Councillor 2: Claude St-Cyr
 Councillor 3: Adrien Gagnon
 Councillor 4: Claude Blain
 Councillor 5: Paul Chaperon
 Councillor 6: Stéphane Poirier

Saint-Augustin-de-Woburn
All elected without opposition.
 Mayor: Steve Charrier
 Councillor 1: Réal A. Vachon
 Councillor 2: Stéphane Grenier
 Councillor 3: Bruno Chouinard
 Councillor 4: Daniel Bédard
 Councillor 5: Réal Chouinard
 Councillor 6: Caroline Chouinard

Saint-Camille
All elected without opposition.
 Mayor: Henri-Paul Bellerose
 Councillor 1: Martin Durand
 Councillor 2: Lyne Deslandes
 Councillor 3: Pierre Bellerose
 Councillor 4: Benoit Bourassa
 Councillor 5: Claude Larose
 Councillor 6: Marc Letendre

Saint-Claude
Electors: 885
Voters: 529 (60%)
Councillors 5 and 6 were elected without opposition.
 Mayor: Hervé Provencher
 Councillor 1: Émilien Dubreuil
 Councillor 2: Marco Scrosati
 Councillor 3: Claude Bazin
 Councillor 4: Robert Plante
 Councillor 5: Jean-Paul L'Heureux
 Councillor 6: Régis Fréchette

Saint-Denis-de-Brompton
All elected without opposition.
 Mayor: Mike Doyle
 Councillor 1: Jean-Guy Émond
 Councillor 2: Étienne-Alexis Boucher
 Councillor 3: Jean-Luc Beauchemin
 Councillor 4: Christiane Vanasse
 Councillor 5: Kurt Serreyn
 Councillor 6: Lise Rouillard

Sainte-Anne-de-la-Rochelle
Mayor and councillors 1, 5 and 6 were elected without opposition.
 Mayor: J. André Bourassa
 Councillor 1: Louis Coutu
 Councillor 2: Gisèle Ferland
 Councillor 3: Jacques Jasmin
 Councillor 4: Réal Vel
 Councillor 5: Jacques Bonneau
 Councillor 6: Jean-Pierre Brien

Sainte-Catherine-de-Hatley
Electors: 1 813
Voters: 934 (52%)
Councillor 4 was elected without opposition.
 Mayor: Jacques Demers
 Councillor 1: Joel Lambert
 Councillor 2: Huguette Larose
 Councillor 3: Nicole-Andrée Blouin
 Councillor 4: René Vaillancourt
 Councillor 5: Ginette Poulin
 Councillor 6: Marie-Claude Poirier

Sainte-Cécile-de-Whitton
All elected without opposition.
 Mayor: Maurice Guay
 Councillor 1: Nathalie Trépanier
 Councillor 2: Gaétan Roy
 Councillor 3: Maurice Roy
 Councillor 4: Edith Robert
 Councillor 5: Roger Nadeau
 Councillor 6: Linda Gosselin

Sainte-Edwidge-de-Clifton
Electors: 357
Voters: 258 (72%)
Councillors 1, 2, 3, 4 and 6 were elected without opposition.
 Mayor: Linda Ouellet
 Councillor 1: Lise Désorcy Côté
 Councillor 2: Jean-Yves Masson
 Councillor 3: Martial Tétreault
 Councillor 4: Christian Lanctôt
 Councillor 5: Jean-Pierre Bessette
 Councillor 6: Gary Caldwell

Saint-Étienne-de-Bolton
All elected without opposition.
 Mayor: Yves Mailhot
 Councillor 1: Benoit Ouellet
 Councillor 2: Brigitte Levert
 Councillor 3: Gaétan Berger
 Councillor 4: Harry Bird
 Councillor 5: Robert Savoie
 Councillor 6: Bruno Auclair

Saint-François-Xavier-de-Brompton
Electors: 1 547
Voters: 1 043 (67%)
Councillors 2 and 4 were elected without opposition.
 Mayor: Daniel Morin
 Councillor 1: Yves Coutu
 Councillor 2: France Perreault
 Councillor 3: Raymond Letarte
 Councillor 4: Yvon Larochelle
 Councillor 5: Pascal Gagnon Lalande
 Councillor 6: Yves Jolin

Saint-Georges-de-Windsor
Mayor and councillors 2, 3, 4, 5 and 6 were elected without opposition.
 Mayor: René Perreault
 Councillor 1: Patrice Pinard
 Councillor 2: Armande Richard
 Councillor 3: Gilles Sirois
 Councillor 4: Yvon Richer
 Councillor 5: Jean-Paul Lamirande
 Councillor 6: Georges Letendre

Saint-Herménégilde
All elected without opposition.
 Mayor: Lucie Tremblay
 Councillor 1: Réal Crête
 Councillor 2: Jean-Claude Daoust
 Councillor 3: Sylvie Fauteux Viau
 Councillor 4: Marc Sage
 Councillor 5: Jean-Claude Charest
 Councillor 6: Ronald Massey

Saint-Isidore-de-Clifton
All elected without opposition.
 Mayor: André Perron
 Councillor 1: Rosaire Perron
 Councillor 2: Hélène Dumais
 Councillor 3: Uwe Lowry
 Councillor 4: Régent Dansereau
 Councillor 5: Christian Lapointe
 Councillor 6: Perry Bell

Saint-Joseph-de-Ham-Sud
Electors: 251
Voters: 221 (88%)
Councillor 3 was elected without opposition.
 Mayor: Langevin Gagnon
 Councillor 1: Rose-Ange St-Onge
 Councillor 2: Donat Lord
 Councillor 3: Richard Larrivée
 Councillor 4: Luc St-Laurent
 Councillor 5: Daniel Lamoureux
 Councillor 6: Georges St-Louis

Saint-Ludger
Mayor and councillors 1, 2, 3, 4 and 5 were elected without opposition.
 Mayor: Félix Destrijker
 Councillor 1: Bernard Therrien
 Councillor 2: André Bureau
 Councillor 3: Marc Therrien
 Councillor 4: Renaud Morin
 Councillor 5: Alexandre Trépanier
 Councillor 6: Yves Nadeau

Saint-Malo
All elected without opposition.
 Mayor: Jacques Madore
 Councillor 1: Benoit Roy
 Councillor 2: Sylvie Robidas
 Councillor 3: Serge Allie
 Councillor 4: Vincent Tremblay
 Councillor 5: Robert Fontaine
 Councillor 6: Réjeanne Perron Montminy

Saint-Robert-Bellarmin
Electors: 568
Voters: 489 (86%)
Councillors 1, 3 and 5 were elected without opposition.
 Mayor: Michel Poulin
 Councillor 1: Jean-François Lachance
 Councillor 2: Germain Nadeau
 Councillor 3: Robert Jolin
 Councillor 4: Maurice Poulin
 Councillor 5: Daniel Dullac
 Councillor 6: Bruno Busque

Saint-Romain
All elected without opposition.
 Mayor: Jean-Luc Fillion
 Councillor 1: Lisette Mercier
 Councillor 2: Vacancy
 Councillor 3: Gérard Jacques
 Councillor 4: Claude Richard
 Councillor 5: Germain Baillargeon
 Councillor 6: Claude Boulanger

Saint-Sébastien
All elected without opposition.
 Mayor: Marcel Proteau
 Councillor 1: Pierre Veilleux
 Councillor 2: Vacancy
 Councillor 3: Suzie Audet
 Councillor 4: Yves Dion
 Councillor 5: Nancy Boulanger
 Councillor 6: Jeannot Roy

Saint-Venant-de-Paquette
All elected without opposition.
 Mayor: Henri Pariseau
 Councillor 1: Claude Desbiens
 Councillor 2: Nathalie Lacasse
 Councillor 3: Daniel Gendreau
 Councillor 4: Sandra Paquet
 Councillor 5: Isabelle Loignon
 Councillor 6: Giovanni Borsellino

Scotstown
Electors: 485
Voters: 333 (69%)
Councillors 3 and 4 were elected without opposition.
 Mayor: Solange Bouffard
 Councillor 1: Michael Boulanger
 Councillor 2: Jean Langlois
 Councillor 3: Marc Gauthier
 Councillor 4: Robert Gabanna
 Councillor 5: Rémy Beauchesne
 Councillor 6: Daniel Gaudreau

Sherbrooke
Electors: 108 273
Voters: 48 234 (45%)
 Mayor: Jean Perrault

Brompton
Borough councillors were elected without opposition.
 Councillor: Nicole Bergeron
 Borough councillor 1: Benoît Dionne
 Borough councillor 2: Michel Lamontagne

Fleurimont
Councillors 2 and 5 were elected without opposition. 
 Councillor 1: Mariette Fugère
 Councillor 2: Roger Labrecque
 Councillor 3: Francis Gagnon
 Councillor 4: Louida Brochu
 Councillor 5: Bernard Tanguay

Jacques-Cartier
 Councillor 1: Jacques Testulat
 Councillor 2: Chantal L'Espérance
 Councillor 3: Marc Denault
 Councillor 4: Dany Lachance

Lennoxville
All elected without opposition.
 Councillor: Douglas MacAulay
 Borough councillor 1: William Smith
 Borough councillor 2: Thomas A. Allen

Mont-Bellevue
 Councillor 1: Serge Paquin
 Councillor 2: Robert Y. Pouliot
 Councillor 3: Pierre Boisvert
 Councillor 4: Jean-François Rouleau

Rock Forest–Saint-Élie–Deauville
 Councillor 1: Diane Délisle
 Councillor 2: Bernard Sévigny
 Councillor 3: Serge Forest
 Councillor 4: Julien Lachance

Stanstead

City of Stanstead
Electors: 2 287
Voters: 1 216 (53%)
Councillors 2 and 5 were elected without opposition.
 Mayor: Raymond Yates
 Councillor 1: Matthew Farfan
 Councillor 2: Susan Wintle
 Councillor 3: Serge Tougas
 Councillor 4: Michelle Richard
 Councillor 5: Philippe Dutil
 Councillor 6: Florent Roy

Township of Stanstead
Electors: 1 009
Voters: 450 (45%)
Councillors 1, 2, 3, 5 and 6 were elected without opposition.
 Mayor: Lionel Larochelle
 Councillor 1: Eric Evans
 Councillor 2: Linda Mary Partington
 Councillor 3: Louison Bégin
 Councillor 4: Stewart Smith
 Councillor 5: Eddie McCaughey
 Councillor 6: Robert Langlois

Stanstead-Est
Electors: 540
Voters: 359 (66%)
All councillors were elected without opposition.
 Mayor: Guy Lefebvre
 Councillor 1: André R. Gaulin
 Councillor 2: Pierre Demers
 Councillor 3: Rock Simard
 Councillor 4: Gilbert Ferland
 Councillor 5: Sylvie Lanoue
 Councillor 6: Manon Roy

Stoke
Electors: 2 018
Voters: 1 107 (55%)
Councillors 2, 4 and 6 were elected without opposition.
 Mayor: Bertrand Ducharme
 Councillor 1: Pierre Mailhot
 Councillor 2: François Hardy
 Councillor 3: Richard Mathieu
 Councillor 4: Michel Picard
 Councillor 5: Luc Cayer
 Councillor 6: Martin Chrétien

Stornoway
All elected without opposition.
 Mayor: Pierre-André Gagné
 Councillor 1: Micheline Charrier
 Councillor 2: Vacancy
 Councillor 3: Mario Lachance
 Councillor 4: Solange Côté
 Councillor 5: Donald Dumas
 Councillor 6: Émilien Carrier

Stratford
Electors: 1 066
Voters: 640 (60%)
Councillors 1, 3, 4 and 5 were elected without opposition.
 Mayor: Guy Cloutier
 Councillor 1: Lise St-Pierre
 Councillor 2: Denise Gauthier
 Councillor 3: Armand Bolduc
 Councillor 4: Jocelyn Côté
 Councillor 5: Émile Chartier
 Councillor 6: Normand Nadeau

Stukely-Sud
Electors: 774
Voters: 458 (59%)
Councillors 1, 3, 4 and 5 were elected without opposition.
 Mayor: Gérald Allaire
 Councillor 1: Jean Legault
 Councillor 2: Dominique Morin
 Councillor 3: Guy Beaudin
 Councillor 4: Gilles Paradis
 Councillor 5: Marcel Saint-Onge
 Councillor 6: Annick Balayer Rousseau

Ulverton
Mayor and councillors 1, 2, 5 and 6 were elected without opposition.
 Mayor: Roger Viens
 Councillor 1: Claire Lafrance
 Councillor 2: Éric Plourde
 Councillor 3: Jean-Guy Demers
 Councillor 4: Daniel Lamothe
 Councillor 5: Claude Lefebvre
 Councillor 6: Patrice Bédard

Valcourt

City of Valcourt 
Electors: 1 803
Voters: 1 042 (58%)
Councillors 1, 2, 4 and 5 were elected without opposition.
 Mayor: Laurian Gagné
 Councillor 1: Benoît Savard
 Councillor 2: Lyne Martel
 Councillor 3: Pierre-Yves Lemay
 Councillor 4: Lise Bolduc
 Councillor 5: Henri-Paul Lavoie
 Councillor 6: Guy Arel

Township of Valcourt
All elected without opposition.
 Mayor: Patrice Desmarais
 Councillor 1: Réjean Malboeuf
 Councillor 2: Réjean Duchesneau
 Councillor 3: Geneviève Fortier
 Councillor 4: Lionel Gravel
 Councillor 5: Bertrand Bombardier
 Councillor 6: Michel Daigneault

Val-Joli
Electors: 1 201
Voters: 622 (52%)
Councillors 2, 4 and 5 were elected without opposition.
 Mayor: Gilles Perron
 Councillor 1: Sylvain Côté
 Councillor 2: Suzanne Grimard
 Councillor 3: André Therrien
 Councillor 4: Richard Boucher
 Councillor 5: Patrick Bernier
 Councillor 6: Lorenzo Bergeron

Val-Racine
All elected without opposition.
 Mayor: Sonia Cloutier
 Councillor 1: Geneviève Beaulieu
 Councillor 2: Isabelle Lapointe Veilleux
 Councillor 3: Alain Côté
 Councillor 4: Tania Janowski
 Councillor 5: Marcel Blais
 Councillor 6: Jacqueline Brière

Waterville
Electors: 1 452
Voters: 745 (51%)
All councillors were elected without opposition.
 Mayor: Gérald Boudreau
 Councillor 1: Antoine Deacon
 Councillor 2: Gladys Bruun
 Councillor 3: Bastien Nadeau
 Councillor 4: Gordon Barnett
 Councillor 5: Gilles Charest
 Councillor 6: Nathalie Dupuis

Weedon
Electors: 2 226
Voters: 1 161 (52%)
All councillors were elected without opposition.
 Mayor: Jean-Claude Dumas
 Councillor 1: Renée-Claude Leroux
 Councillor 2: Réjean Giard
 Councillor 3: Lise Lessard
 Councillor 4: Raynald Breton
 Councillor 5: Marc Lavertu
 Councillor 6: Julio Carrier

Westbury
All elected without opposition.
 Mayor: Kenneth Coates
 Councillor 1: Jean-Luc Laplante
 Councillor 2: Réjean Vachon
 Councillor 3: Line Cloutier
 Councillor 4: Cécile Tellier-Roy
 Councillor 5: Yves Allaire
 Councillor 6: Denis Veilleux

Windsor
Electors: 4 199
Voters: 2 325 (55%)
Councillor 3 was elected without opposition.
 Mayor: Malcolm Wheeler
 Councillor 1: Sylvie Bureau
 Councillor 2: Mario Leclerc
 Councillor 3: Jean-Pierre Roy
 Councillor 4: Aurore Milette
 Councillor 5: Jason S. Noble
 Councillor 6: Alain Beaudin

Wotton
Electors: 1 203
Voters: 833 (69%)
Councillors 2 and 3 were elected without opposition.
 Mayor: Ghislain Drouin
 Councillor 1: Fernand Bourget
 Councillor 2: Denis Leroux
 Councillor 3: Sophie Groleau
 Councillor 4: Monique Thibault-Bélisle
 Councillor 5: Annik Giguère
 Councillor 6: Léopold Cormier

2005 Quebec municipal elections
Estrie